The Federal Supreme Court of Iraq (Al-Mahkamah al-Ittihādiyah al-‘Ulyā) is the independent judicial body of Iraq that interprets the constitution and determines the constitutionality of laws and regulations. It acts as a final court of appeals, settles disputes among or between the federal government and the regions and governorates, municipalities, and local administrations, and settles accusations directed against the President, the Prime Minister and the Ministers. It also ratifies the final results of the general elections for the Council of Representatives.

History
In February 2013, the De-Ba'athification Commission decided to remove Chief Justice Medhat al-Mahmoud. Al-Mahmoud then filed a successful appeal to the cassation panel, which on 19 February 2013 failed to find any strong evidence of ties to Saddam Hussein and rejected al-Mahmoud's dismissal.

References

External links
Constitutional Courts after the Arab Spring

Government of Iraq
Law of Iraq
Iraq
Judiciary of Iraq
2005 establishments in Iraq
Courts and tribunals established in 2005